Grotescapology is the first demo CD by British gothic metal band Devilment. It was released in 2012 independently.

Track listing

Members 
 Dani Filth – vocals
 Dan Jackson – lead guitar
 Daniel John Finch – rhythm guitar
 Kev Jackson – bass
 Kieron De Manns – keyboards, samples
 Simon Dawson – drums
 David Jimmy James – additional keyboards

References

External links 
 

2012 albums
Demo albums
Devilment albums